The 2019 Los Angeles FC season was the club's second season in Major League Soccer, the top tier of the American soccer pyramid. Los Angeles FC played its home matches at the Banc of California Stadium in the Exposition Park neighborhood of Los Angeles. Outside of MLS play, the team participated in the 2019 U.S. Open Cup tournament and qualified for the 2019 MLS Cup Playoffs, reaching the Conference Finals.

Squad

First-team roster

Team management

Technical staff

Transfers

Transfers in

Transfers out

Draft picks

Competitions

Preseason

Major League Soccer

Standings

Western Conference

Overall

Results summary

Results by round

Results 
All times are Pacific.

MLS Cup

U.S. Open Cup 

Los Angeles FC entered the U.S. Open Cup in the fourth round, along with the other 20 American MLS teams. The draw was announced on May 30, and matches took place on June 11/12.

Player statistics

Appearances and goals
Last updated on October 29, 2019

|-
! colspan=14 style=background:#dcdcdc; text-align:center|Goalkeepers

|-
! colspan=14 style=background:#dcdcdc; text-align:center|Defenders

|-
! colspan=14 style=background:#dcdcdc; text-align:center|Midfielders

|-
! colspan=14 style=background:#dcdcdc; text-align:center|Forwards

|-
! colspan=14 style=background:#dcdcdc; text-align:center| Players who have made an appearance or had a squad number this season but have left the club

|-
|}

Top scorers 
{| class="wikitable sortable alternance"  style="font-size:85%; text-align:center; line-height:14px; width:85%;"
|-
!width=10|Rank
!width=10|Nat.
! scope="col" style="width:275px;"|Player
!width=10|Pos.
!width=80|Major League Soccer
!width=80|MLS Cup Playoffs
!width=80|U.S. Open Cup
!width=80|TOTAL
|-
|1|||| Carlos Vela        || FW || 34 || 2 || 2 || 38
|-
|2|||| Diego Rossi      || FW || 16 || 1 || 1||18
|-
|3|||| Adama Diomande      || FW || 8 || 2 || 2 ||12
|-
|4|||| Latif Blessing      || MF || 6 || 0 || 0 ||6
|-
|rowspan=3|5|||| Eduard Atuesta      || MF || 3 || 1 || 0 ||4
|-
||| Mark-Anthony Kaye      || MF || 4 || 0 || 0 ||4
|-
||| Christian Ramirez      || FW || 4 || 0 || 0 ||4
|-
|rowspan=10|8|||| Steven Beitashour      || DF || 1 || 0 || 0 ||1
|-
||| Tristan Blackmon      || DF || 1 || 0 || 0 ||1
|-
||| Mohamed El Monir      || DF || 1 || 0 || 0 ||1
|-
||| Jordan Harvey      || DF || 1 || 0 || 0 ||1
|-
||| Lee Nguyen      || MF || 0 || 0 || 1 ||1
|-
||| Adrien Perez      || FW || 1 || 0 || 0 ||1
|-
||| Joshua Pérez      || FW || 1 || 0 || 0 ||1
|-
||| Eddie Segura      || DF || 1 || 0 || 0 ||1
|-
||| Rodolfo Zelaya      || FW || 1 || 0 || 0 ||1
|-
||| Walker Zimmerman      || DF || 1 || 0 || 0 ||1
|-
|colspan="4"|Own goals
| 1
| 0
| 0
| 1
|- class="sortbottom"
| colspan="4"|Totals||85||6||6||97

References

External links 
Los Angeles Football Club Official Site

2018
2019 Major League Soccer season
American soccer clubs 2019 season
Los Angeles FC
Los Angeles FC
2019